The 1947 New York Yankees season was their second in the All-America Football Conference. The team improved on their previous output of 10-3-1, winning eleven games. For the second consecutive season, they lost to the Cleveland Browns in the AAFC Championship.

The team's statistical leaders included Spec Sanders with 1,442 passing yards, 1,432 rushing yards, and 114 points scored, and Jack Russell with 368 receiving yards.

Season schedule

Playoffs

Division standings

References

New York Yankees (AAFC) seasons
New York Yankees
New York Yankees AAFC
1940s in the Bronx